Rinaldo de Lamare (1910 in Santos, São Paulo – 2002 in Rio de Janeiro) was a Brazilian physician who specialized in pediatrics and a writer of books on child health and care for the general public. His family was of Danish and Norman origins. His father, Victor de Lamare, was an engineer. Aged 16 he moved to Rio de Janeiro, to prepare himself to study medicine at the medical school of the Federal University of Rio de Janeiro.

His best known book, "A Vida do Bebê" (The Baby's Life) has sold more than 6,5 million copies in 41 editions. He revised and updated the book a number of times, and it is considered the best reference for Brazilian parents.

He was a strong proponent of what he considered the three greatest breakthroughs in child health: antibiotics, vaccines and breast feeding. He was also the first to introduce the use of a simple recipe for a home care isotonic and nutritive solution for the treatment of infant diarrhea, which was a big killer in the first half of the 20th century in Brazil.

Dr. de Lamare was a member and president of the Brazilian National Academy of Medicine and member of the American Academy of Pediatrics, a member and president of the Sociedade Brasileira de Pediatria (1948–1949) and full professor at Pontifical Catholic University. From 1964 to 1965 he was also a director of the National Child Department of the Ministry of Health.

Dr de Lamare had a busy private practice in Rio, with more than 60,000 patients on record. He stopped practising after 1985, when he underwent a heart bypass operation.

Books
 A Vida do Bebê
 Diario do Bebê Rosa
 Diário do Bebê: Eu e os Meus Primeiros Anos
 A Grávida e o Bebê: da Concepção ao Parto
 A Vida de Nossos Filhos (2 a 16 Anos)

References

External links
 Dalevi, A. The Pediatrician of Us All. A biographical article in English about Dr. Rinaldo de Lamare.

1910 births
2002 deaths
People from Santos, São Paulo
Brazilian pediatricians
Brazilian male writers
Brazilian people of Italian descent
Federal University of Rio de Janeiro alumni
Academic staff of the Pontifical Catholic University of Rio de Janeiro